Rosalind Chanette Ross (January 17, 1980 – September 15, 2010) was a basketball player drafted by the Los Angeles Sparks of the WNBA. On September 15, 2010, she was shot and killed by her long time partner.

Career
Ross was a standout player at Milwaukee Technical High School. She then was a Junior College All-American for two years at Northeastern Oklahoma A&M College, then transferred to the University of Oklahoma.  In 2002, despite being sidelined with knee surgery, the Los Angeles Sparks picked her in the First Round of the WNBA draft.  Ross never played a game in the WNBA, and was released by the Sparks in May 2003.

Honors

University of Oklahoma Sooners
All-Big 12 Tournament team, 2001

Oklahoma statistics

Source

Northeastern Oklahoma A&M Lady Norse
Two-time Junior College All-American, 1999, 2000
Two-time Junior College All-Conference, 1999, 2000

Personal life
Ross majored in sociology. After basketball Ross worked as a security guard for Briggs & Stratton.

In 2010, Ross was shot and killed on Milwaukee's North Side, while waiting in the drive-thru of a fast food restaurant, by Malika Willoughby, her female partner since they were teenagers. Ross had just informed Willoughby that she had accepted a job as a recruiter with the Oklahoma Sooners and would be leaving without her. Willoughby was sentenced to 13 years in prison in 2011.

References

1980 births
2010 deaths
African-American basketball players
American women's basketball players
Deaths by firearm in Wisconsin
Female murder victims
Guards (basketball)
LGBT African Americans
LGBT basketball players
LGBT people from Wisconsin
Los Angeles Sparks draft picks
Murdered African-American people
Northeastern Oklahoma A&M Lady Norse basketball players
Oklahoma Sooners women's basketball players
People murdered in Wisconsin
Basketball players from Milwaukee
20th-century African-American people
21st-century African-American sportspeople
20th-century African-American women
21st-century African-American women
Uxoricides